

Specific locations
1884 in Norwegian music

Events 
 September 27 – The Hungarian Royal Opera House in Budapest opens.

Bands formed
Cory Band

Published popular music 
 "Oh My Darling, Clementine"     w.m. Percy Montrose
 "The Coon's Salvation Army" by Sam Lucas
 "The Fountain in the Park" aka "While Strolling Through the Park One Day"  w.m. Ed Haley
 "The Golden Wedding"     m. Gabriel-Marie
 "Love's Old Sweet Song"     w. George Clifton Bingham m. James Lynam Molloy
 "March of the Plumed Knight" by Charles B. Morrell & William Howard Doane
 "My Thoughts Are of Thee" by Sam Lucas
 "Otchi Tchorniya" by Y. P. Grebyonka & F. Hermann
 "Rest, Comrades, Rest (Memorial Hymn)" by O. B. Ormsby
 "Rock-a-bye Baby"     w.m. Effie I. Canning
 "When the Heather Blooms Again" by Frances Jane Crosby & William Howard Doane

Classical music
Anton Bruckner – Te Deum (begun 1881)
Henri Duparc – La Vie Antérieure
Antonín Dvořák – Ballade in D minor
César Franck – Prelude, Chorale, and Fugue
Robert Fuchs – Symphony No. 1 in C
Alexander Glazunov – String Quartet No. 2 Opus 10 in F major 
Charles Gounod – Mors et Vita (oratorio)
Richard Strauss – Symphony No. 2
Hugo Wolf – String Quartet in D minor (begun 1878)

Opera

Eduard Caudella – Hatmanul Baltag
Luigi Mancinelli – Isora di Provenza
Miguel Marqués – El reloj de Lucerna
Jules Massenet – Manon
Karl Millöcker – Gasparone
Viktor Nessler – Der Trompeter von Säkkingen
Giacomo Puccini – Le Villi
Charles Villiers Stanford – The Canterbury Pilgrims
Felix Weingartner – Sakuntala

Musical theater
 Adonis Broadway production opened at the Bijou Theatre on September 4 and ran for 603 performances
 The Beggar Student London production opened at the Alhambra Theatre on April 12 and ran for 112 performances
 The Grand Mogul London production
 Princess Ida London production opened at the Savoy Theatre on January 5 and ran for 246 performances
 Princess Ida Broadway production opened at the Fifth Avenue Theatre on February 11 and ran for 48 performances

Births 
January 13 – Sophie Tucker, singer
February 22 – York Bowen, pianist and composer (died 1961)
March 17 – Alcide Nunez, clarinetist
March 18 – Joe Burke, pianist, composer and actor (died 1950)
March 26 – Wilhelm Backhaus, German pianist (died 1969)
April 22 – Armas Launis, Finnish composer and ethnomusicologist (died 1959)
April 23 – Jurgis Karnavičius, Lithuanian composer (died 1941)
May 19 – Arthur Meulemans, composer (died 1966)
May 27 – Max Brod, author, composer and journalist (died 1968)
August 7 – Billie Burke, American actress and singer (d. 1970)
August 13 – Edwin Grasse, composer and violinist (died 1954)
September 6 – Emerson Whithorne (birth name Emerson Whittern), composer and historian (died 1958)
September 17 – Charles Tomlinson Griffes, composer (died 1920)
September 24 – Jonny Heykens, composer and orchestra leader (died 1945)
October 6 – Oliphant Chuckerbutty, organist and composer (died 1960)
November 1 – David Roitman, hazzan and composer (died 1943)
November 6
May Brahe, composer and songwriter (died 1956)
Ludomir Rozycki, composer (d. 1953)
November 19 – Norman Allin, English singer (d. 1973)
November 23 – Guy Bolton, English librettist
November 30 – Ture Rangström, composer (died 1947)
December 29 – Foster Adolph Reynolds, brass instrument maker (died 1960 at work)
date unknown – Alfred Reynolds, English composer (d. 1969)

Deaths 
January 21 – Auguste Franchomme, cellist (dedicatee of works by Chopin)
January 25 – Johann Gottfried Piefke, conductor and composer
February 14 – Franz Wohlfahrt, violin teacher
February 21 – John Pyke Hullah, composer and music teacher (b. 1812)
April 24 – Marie Taglioni, ballerina
April 29 – Michael Costa, conductor and composer
May 12 – Bedřich Smetana, composer (b. 1824)
June 25 – Hans Rott, composer (b. 1858)
June 8 – Henry Clay Work, US composer
July 5 – Victor Massé, composer
August 18 – , composer (b. 1808)
November 27 – Fanny Elssler, dancer
December 4 – Alice Mary Smith, composer (b. 1839)
date unknown – Velvel Zbarjer, Brody singer

References

 
19th century in music
Music by year